Zim or ZIM may refer to:

Country
Zimbabwe, the country in the centre of Southern Africa

Business
 Air Zim, the national airline of Zimbabwe
 Zim Dollar, shorthand for the Zimbabwean dollar
 ZIM (shipping company), Israel

Film and television
 Invader Zim, a 2001 animated television series
 Zim and Co., 2005 French film

People

Given or nickname 
 Don Zimmer ("Zim"; born 1931), former baseball player and manager
 Eugene Zimmerman ("Zim"; 1862-1935), American cartoonist's signature
 Zim Ngqawana (1959–2011), South African musician
 Zim Zum (born 1969), American rock musician
 Zim, character in Invader Zim TV series
 Zim, fictional nephew of Yzma in The Emperor's New Groove
 Zim, Rapper from Ohio, US.

Surname 
 Charles Zim, a Starship Troopers character
 Herbert Zim (1909–1994), naturalist
 Jake Zim, executive at Sony Pictures Entertainment
 Sol Zim (Solomon Zimelman, born 1939). Jewish cantor, US

Places
 Žim, Czech Republic
 Zim, Minnesota, USA
 Zim Smith Trail, a recreational trail in Saratoga County, New York
 Zim Zim Falls, a waterfall in Napa County, California

Technology
 GAZ-12 ZIM, a Soviet limousine
 Zim, language code of the Mesme language
 Zim (software),  wiki software
 ZIM (file format) for Wikimedia

 Źim, a letter in the Pashto alphabet

See also
 
 Zima (disambiguation)